Elachista herrichii is a moth of the family Elachistidae. It is found from the Baltic region to the Pyrenees, Italy and Romania.

The larvae feed on Agrostis, Bromus pannonicus, Festuca arvernensis, Holcus, Koeleria glauca and Koeleria macrantha. They mine the leaves of their host plant. Just after hibernation, the larvae create mine which has the form of a fine, yellowish green shallow corridor in the basal part of the leaf. It then turns upwards and widens to the full width of the blade. The frass is scattered irregularly. Pupation takes place outside of the mine. They are yellow with a pale brown head. Larvae can be found from autumn to April or May and again from July to early August.

References

herrichii
Moths described in 1859
Moths of Europe